Funan County is a county in the northwest of Anhui province, China, bordering Henan province to the south. It is under the administration of the prefecture-level city of Fuyang.

Administrative divisions
Funan County administers 21 towns and 8 townships. Former divisions are indicated in italics.

21 Towns
 Lucheng-it was formed from the merger on 27 December 2006 of Chengguan Town and Chengjiao Township.

 Yuanji - it was merged to Yingzhou District's administration on 10 October 2006.

8 Townships

Climate

References

External links
Official website of the Funan County government 

Fuyang
County-level divisions of Anhui